Roger Normand Begin (born November 19, 1952) was the Lieutenant Governor of the U.S. State of Rhode Island from 1989 to 1993.

Career 
He is a Democrat. He previously served in the Rhode Island House of Representatives from 1973 to 1984. He is an alumnus of the Community College of Rhode Island.

References

Lieutenant Governors of Rhode Island
Democratic Party members of the Rhode Island House of Representatives
Community College of Rhode Island alumni
Bryant University alumni
1952 births
Living people